Colonel George Bruce Malleson    (8 May 1825 – 1 March 1898) was an English officer in India and author.

Biography

Malleson was born in Wimbledon. Educated at Winchester, he obtained a cadetship in the Bengal infantry in 1842, and served through the second Burmese War. His subsequent appointments were in the civil line, the last being that of guardian to the young maharaja of Mysore. He retired with the rank of colonel in 1877, having been created C.S.I. in the 1872 Birthday Honours.

He was a voluminous writer, his first work to attract attention being the famous "Red Pamphlet", published at Calcutta in 1857, when the Sepoy Mutiny was at its height. He continued, and considerably rewrote the History of the Indian Mutiny 1857-8 (6 vols., 1878–1880), which was begun but left unfinished by Sir John Kaye. Among his other books the most valuable are History of the French in India (2nd ed., 1893) and The Decisive Battles of India (3rd ed., 1888).

He authored the biographies of the Mughal Emperor Akbar, the French governor-general Dupleix and the British officer Robert Clive for the Rulers of India series.

He died at 27 West Cromwell Road, London, on 1 March 1898.

Works
 
  Full text online at ibiblio.org (All six volumes, including the first two originally by Sir John Kaye, in HTML form, complete, chapter-by-chapter, with all illustrations, footnotes and a combined index)
Volume I. 1878.
Volume III. 1880.
Volume V. 1889.
  Pub. 1883. Full text online at ibiblio.org (In HTML form, complete, chapter-by-chapter, with all illustrations and footnotes)
  Full text online at archive.org. Malleson's own condensed version of the six-volume history.
  Pub. 1896. Full text online at ibiblio.org (In HTML form, complete, chapter-by-chapter, with all illustrations and footnotes)
 History of the French in India 1893 (2nd revised ed.)
 Dupleix and the Struggle for India by the European Nations 1899
History of Afghanistan, from the Earliest Period to the Outbreak of the War of 1878. Pub. 1879. 2nd ed. London: W.H. Allen & Co. A translation of this work was used for training British military interpreters in the Pashto language.

References

Attribution:

Further reading

External links

 
 
 

19th-century English historians
1825 births
1898 deaths
British East India Company Army officers
People from Wimbledon, London
British Army personnel of the Second Anglo-Burmese War
People educated at Winchester College
Companions of the Order of the Star of India
English biographers